The 2023 IIHF Women's U18 World Championship was the 15th Women's U18 World Championship in ice hockey which took place in Östersund, Sweden, January 8–15, 2023.

Top Division
The Top Division tournament is played in Östersund, Sweden, from 8 to 15 January 2023.

Match officials
Ten referees and ten linesmen were selected for the tournament.

Referees
 Jennifer Berezowski
 Zuzana Svobodová
 Vanessa Anselm
 Holly Neenan
 Anna Kuroda
 Sintija Čamane
 Ida Henriksson
 Veronica Lovensnö
 Taylor Hanvelt
 Jenna Janshen

Linesmen
 Wang Hui
 Kristina Hájková
 Caroline Butt
 Leonie Ernst
 Alexia Cheyroux
 Britt Kösters
 Natalia Witkowska
 Anina Egli
 Melanie Gotsdiner
 Breana Kraut

Preliminary round
All times are local (UTC+1).

Group A

Group B

Relegation round
The third and fourth placed team from Group B played a best-of-three series to determine the relegated team.

Final round
Teams will be reseeded for the semifinals in accordance with the following ranking:

tier of the group;
position in the group.

Bracket

Quarterfinals

Semifinals

Fifth place game

Bronze medal game

Gold medal game

Awards and statistics

Awards 

Best player selected by the Directorate

Source: IIHF

All-Star team

Source: IIHF

Scoring leaders
List shows the top skaters sorted by points, then goals.

GP = Games played; G = Goals; A = Assists; Pts = Points; +/− = Plus/minus; PIM = Penalties in minutes; POS = Position
Source: IIHF

Leading goaltenders
Only the top five goaltenders, based on save percentage, who have played at least 40% of their team's minutes, are included in this list.

TOI = Time on ice (minutes:seconds); SA = Shots against; GA = Goals against; GAA = Goals against average; Sv% = Save percentage; SO = Shutouts
Source: IIHF

Final standings

Division I

Group A
The tournament was held in Ritten, Italy from 9 to 15 January 2023.

Group B
The tournament was held in Katowice, Poland from 10 to 15 January 2023.

Division II

Group A
The tournament was held in Dumfries, Great Britain from 21 to 27 January 2023.

Group B
The tournament was held in Sofia, Bulgaria from 26 January to 1 February 2023.

References

External links
Official website of IIHF

IIHF World Women's U18 Championships
2022–23 in women's ice hockey
IIHF
IIHF
International ice hockey competitions hosted by Sweden
2023 in ice hockey
Sports competitions in Östersund
2023 in women's sport
Ice hockey